Gu Hong (born 6 November 1988) is a Chinese boxer and Olympic medalist. She is a two-time silver medalist at the AIBA Women's World Boxing Championships and a three-time gold medalist at the Asian Amateur Boxing Championships. She won a silver medal in the women's welterweight event at the 2020 Summer Olympics.

References

1988 births
Living people
Chinese women boxers
Olympic boxers of China
Boxers at the 2020 Summer Olympics
Medalists at the 2020 Summer Olympics
Olympic silver medalists for China
Olympic medalists in boxing
Place of birth missing (living people)
AIBA Women's World Boxing Championships medalists
Welterweight boxers
Sportspeople from Dandong